Barthe is a commune in the Hautes-Pyrénées department in southwestern France

Barthe or Barthé may also refer to:

Barthe (surname)
Barthe (river), Germany
La Barthe-de-Neste, a different commune in the Hautes-Pyrénées department in southwestern France

See also
Barthes (disambiguation)
Barth (disambiguation)